John Thewlis junior (21 September 1850 – 9 August 1901) was an English first-class cricketer, who played three matches for Yorkshire County Cricket Club in 1876.

Born in Lascelles Hall, Huddersfield, Yorkshire, England, Thewlis was a right-handed batsman, who hit 21 runs at 5.25, with a best of ten against the Marylebone Cricket Club (MCC).  His right and round-arm bowling was never employed in the first-class game. He was of considerable cricketing pedigree, his cousin, Ephraim Lockwood, playing 328 first-class games and a Yorkshire stalwart for many years, while his uncle, John Thewlis Senior, played over fifty matches for the county.

Thewlis died in Huddersfield in August 1901.

References

External links
Cricinfo Profile

1850 births
1901 deaths
Yorkshire cricketers
Cricketers from Huddersfield
English cricketers